Anand Tummala (born 21 October 1978 in Vuyyuru, Andhra Pradesh, India) also known as T. Anand, is a cricketer for the United States.

Anand first appeared in the United States national cricket team as an all-rounder in 2011 in the Etihad T20 Cricket Tournament hosted by Cricket Canada in King City, Ontario (11–13 August 2011). Anand made an impression with his debut bowling figures of 3 over, 1 maiden, 10 runs and 2 wickets against archrivals Canada. Anand bowled exceptionally well against Trinidad and Tobago in the second match, with figures of 2 for 24 in 4 Overs.

Anand went on to be part of USA Cricket Team in the historical K.A. Auty Trophy (2-day match, played on 15 and 16 August 2011, held at Toronto Cricket, Skating & Curling Club which dates back to 1844 between the US and Canada.

Anand’s performance in the K.A. Auty Trophy was excellent, with match bowling figures of 25 overs, 97 runs, 3 maidens and 3 wickets. Anand scored 88 runs in the match, with 63 being his highest in the second innings, which almost won the game for the US.

Anand also played First-class cricket in India (Ranji Trophy) for Delhi in 2001–02 and has also played Premier league cricket in South Wales, UK. He completed his Schooling from Sardar Patel Vidyalaya, New Delhi, and college from St. Stephen's College, Delhi University.

Anand also acquired his Level I and level II cricket coaching certifications from the England & Wales Cricket Board during his stay at the University of Wales, Newport, where he completed his MBA in 2007.

Anand was appointed coach and captain for the University of Wales, Newport Cricket team and also went on to be signed as senior coach and player for Croesyceiliog Cricket Club in South Wales Premier League, UK.

Anand has also worked closely with Bishan Bedi (former Indian team coach and captain) while he represented Bishan Bedi Cricket Coaching Trust teams in England and Australia.

Anand now plays for North Atlanta Cricket Club in the Atlanta Georgia Cricket Conference (AGCC). He has also represented South East Region of the US, where he has performed exceptionally well.

In August 2016, Anand was named the head coach for the USA Women's Cricket Development Squad and USA Women's Cricket Team against the touring Marylebone Cricket Club (MCC) Women's team.

Anand was also named assistant coach for USA Men's Cricket Team in October 2016, with Pubudu Dassanayake as the head coach. USA Men's cricket team went on to win the World Cricket League (WCL) Division 4 championship in October–November 2016.

References 

1978 births
Living people
Cricketers from Andhra Pradesh
Indian cricketers
People from Krishna district